Augustin Thomas Pouyer-Quertier, (2 September 1820 – 2 April 1891) was Minister for Finance of France.

He was born in Étouteville-en-Caux (Seine-Maritime) and died in Rouen.
He developed a cotton factory and cotton agriculture in Algeria. 

He was one of the founders of Compagnie française du télégraphe de Paris à New-York, the French Telegraph Company, in 1879. 

1820 births
1891 deaths
People from Seine-Maritime
French Ministers of Finance
Senators of Seine-Maritime